Kathleen Rose Funder (19 September 1941 – 13 June 1998) was an Australian social scientist, who is recognised for her significant contribution to the Australian Institute of Family Studies as a Principal Research Fellow.

Biography 
Funder completed her postgraduate education at The University of Melbourne, receiving an MA in 1983 and a PhD in 2001.

After graduating, Funder taught English at the Geelong West Technical School and at the Emily McPherson College, before joining the Department of Education as a psychologist.

In 1983 Funder joined the Australian Institute of Family Studies as a Principal Research Fellow. This marked the beginning of a fifteen-year career at the Institute. During this time she led and participated in research that determined family wellbeing – including divorce, single parenthood, care of children, and property rights. Kathleen was an influential voice in public debates and contributed to scholarly journals, mainstream press and government inquiries.

Among her many publications were books Images of Australian Families: approaches and perceptions, and Remaking families: adaption of parents and children to divorce. Kathleen also contributed to Family Matters; a research journal of the Australian Institute of Family Studies.

Funder was an observer on the Family Law Council of Australia and a member of the Australian Law Reform Commission Reference on Children and the Law. She was also a member of the Committee on Family Research of the International Sociological Association and the National Council on Family Relations in the United States.

The Kate Funder Scholarships were established in 2008. The scholarships provide support for two medical students at the University of Melbourne's Newman College.

There are some biographical cuttings relating to Funder at the National Library of Australia. Funder Street in the Canberra suburb of Bruce is named after her.

Published works

Books 
 Images of Australian families : approaches and perceptions, 1991.
 Citizen child : Australian law and children's rights, 1996. 
 Settling down : pathways of parents after divorce, 1992.
 Remaking families : adaptation of parents and children to divorce, 1996.
 Family Law Evaluation 1996 : parental responsibilities : two national surveys (with Bruce Smyth), 1996.
 Citizen Child : Australian Law and Children's Rights, 1996.
 The workforce attachment of sole parents and ILO Convention 156 (report commissioned by The Department of Social Security) (with Christine Millward), 1993.
 Safety net or snare? : divorced women's reliance on social security (with Christine Barczak), 1989.

Conference Proceedings 
 Family configurations : post-divorce insights from children, 1989.

Articles 
 Financial support and relationships with children, 1989.
 A psychologist in family studies: research and social policy, 1994.
 Australia, a proposal for reform : Economic hardship and inequalities due to marriage breakdown, 1992.
 The Australian Family Law Reform Act and public attitudes to parental responsibility, 1998.
 Marriage, parenthood and the law, 1993.
 Changes in child support : Changes to the Child Support Scheme announced by the Federal Government in 1997, 1997.

References

1941 births
1998 deaths
Australian psychologists
Australian women psychologists
Australian social scientists
University of Melbourne women
20th-century psychologists